Maria Alice de Mendonça is a pianist from Brazil. She won the Latin Grammy Award from the Latin Academy of Recording Arts & Sciences. She has also performed at the Badia di Cava Music Festival and the International Music Festival of Villaller.

She is currently completing her Doctorate in Piano Performance at UCLA, Los Angeles.

References

External links
 Official Website
 Classical Voice of North Carolina: Mendonça Misjudges Audience, by Roy Dicks

Living people
Brazilian pianists
Brazilian women pianists
21st-century pianists
Year of birth missing (living people)
21st-century women pianists